A Woman's Way is a 1928 American silent drama film directed by Edmund Mortimer and starring Margaret Livingston, Warner Baxter and Armand Kaliz.

Cast
 Margaret Livingston as Liane 
 Warner Baxter as Tony 
 Armand Kaliz as Jean 
 Mathilde Comont as Mother Suzy 
 Ernie Adams as Pedro 
 John St. Polis as Mouvet

References

Bibliography
 Adrienne L. McLean. Dying Swans and Madmen: Ballet, the Body, and Narrative Cinema. Rutgers University Press, 2008.

External links
 

1928 films
1928 drama films
1920s English-language films
American silent feature films
Silent American drama films
Films directed by Edmund Mortimer
American black-and-white films
Columbia Pictures films
1920s American films